Hoppity may refer to:

 Hoppity, a British board game of the 19th century, which was the inspiration for Halma
 Hoppity, a toy in the 1960s British puppet TV series Sara and Hoppity
 Hoppity the Grasshopper, the main character in the 1941 American animated film Mr. Bug Goes to Town
 Hoppity Hooper, an American animated TV series of the 1960s

See also 
 Space hopper, also known as hoppity hop, a rubber ball toy